"Cachito" is the last radio single and fifth track from Maná's second live album, Maná MTV Unplugged (1999). On the week of February 12, 2000 the song debuted and reach at its highest peak at number twenty four on the U.S. Billboard Hot Latin Tracks. It would stayed for a total of 4 weeks.

Charts

References

2000 singles
Maná songs
Spanish-language songs
Songs written by Fher Olvera
Warner Music Latina singles
1992 songs